The 1987 Victorian Football League (VFL) season was the ninety-first season of the VFL. The season saw 143 Australian rules footballers make their senior VFL debut and 67 players transfer to new clubs having previously played in the VFL.

Summary

Debuts

References

Australian rules football records and statistics
Australian rules football-related lists
1987 in Australian rules football